Assembly hall may refer to:

In general
An assembly hall, a large room for public meetings or a type of building

Or more specifically:
Church assembly hall, sometimes referring to the local churches, a Christian group affiliated with Watchman Nee and Witness Lee

United Kingdom
General Assembly Hall of the Church of Scotland in Edinburgh, Scotland.
Assembly Hall Theatre, Tunbridge Wells in Royal Tunbridge Wells, England.

United States
State Farm Center, known as Assembly Hall until 2013, an arena in Champaign, Illinois.
Simon Skjodt Assembly Hall, known as Assembly Hall until 2016, an arena in Bloomington, Indiana.
Assembly Hall (Washington, Mississippi), a NRHP-listed tavern in Washington, Mississippi.
Old Municipal Assembly Hall, Victoria, Texas, listed on the NRHP in Victoria County, Texas
Salt Lake Assembly Hall, in Salt Lake City, Utah
Assembly Hall (Hunter College), in New York City

Other countries
Assembly Hall, Warwick, Australia
Mansudae Assembly Hall, North Korea
Former Tainan Assembly Hall, Taiwan

See also
Assembly rooms

Architectural disambiguation pages